James Verlin Mertz (August 10, 1916 – February 4, 2003) was a pitcher in Major League Baseball. He played for the Washington Senators.

References

External links

Baseball Almanac

1916 births
2003 deaths
Major League Baseball pitchers
Washington Senators (1901–1960) players
Baseball players from Ohio
Sportspeople from Lima, Ohio